Hanna Siarheyeuna Dudzenkova (born 7 May 1994) is a Belarusian female rhythmic gymnast. Dudzenkova won a silver medal as a member of the national squad at the 2016 European Championships in Holon, Israel, and eventually competed alongside her teammates Maria Kadobina, Maryia Katsiak, Valeriya Pischelina, and Arina Tsitsilina at the 2016 Summer Olympics in Rio de Janeiro, finishing outside of medals in the group all-around final with a fifth-place score of 35.299.

References

External links 
 

1994 births
Living people
Belarusian rhythmic gymnasts
Sportspeople from Grodno
Gymnasts at the 2016 Summer Olympics
Olympic gymnasts of Belarus
Gymnasts at the 2015 European Games
European Games medalists in gymnastics
European Games gold medalists for Belarus
European Games bronze medalists for Belarus
Medalists at the Rhythmic Gymnastics European Championships
21st-century Belarusian women